Wilfrid Laurier University (commonly referred to as WLU or simply Laurier) is a public university in Ontario, Canada, with campuses in Waterloo, Brantford and Milton. The newer Brantford and Milton campuses are not considered satellite campuses of the original Waterloo campus; instead the university describes itself as a "multi-campus multi-community university". The university also operates offices in Kitchener, Toronto, and Yellowknife. It is named in honour of Sir Wilfrid Laurier, the seventh Prime Minister of Canada. The university offers undergraduate and graduate programs in a variety of fields, with over 17,000 full-time undergraduate students, over 1000 full-time graduate students, and nearly 4,000 part-time students as of fall 2019. Laurier's varsity teams, known as the Wilfrid Laurier Golden Hawks, compete in the West Conference of the Ontario University Athletics, affiliated to the U Sports.

History

In 1910, the Lutheran Synod established a seminary, which opened to students in 1911, as the Evangelical Lutheran Theological Seminary of Eastern Canada. In 1914, the seminary developed non-theological courses under the name "the Waterloo College School". In 1924, the Waterloo College of Arts was established. Waterloo College of Arts became affiliated with the University of Western Ontario ("Western") in 1925 and soon began to offer honours degree programs in the arts. In 1960, the Lutheran Church relinquished its sponsorship of Waterloo College and obtained a revised charter, changing the name of the seminary to Waterloo Lutheran University. On November 1, 1973, the name was again changed to Wilfrid Laurier University when the relevant provincial law was given royal assent by Ontario Lieutenant-Governor Ross Macdonald, who later served as Laurier's chancellor.  Waterloo Lutheran University's seminary and theological programs continued to be offered by the affiliated Waterloo Lutheran Seminary (now Martin Luther University College). The Waterloo Lutheran board of governors had approved the change of name at its meeting of June 12, 1973. 

Laurier's school colours, purple and gold, extend from its early affiliation with the University of Western Ontario; they were originally maroon and gold. The colours have remained although the affiliation with Western ebbed in 1960.

Expansion
Laurier opened a second campus, in Brantford, in 1999, and in 2006, the Lyle S. Hallman Faculty of Social Work moved from the Waterloo campus to a campus in downtown Kitchener. The Brantford campus is centred on a number of historic properties in the downtown area which have been restored for university use. They include a former Carnegie library, Brantford's 1880 post office, and 1870 mansion, and a 1950 Odeon Theatre. The Kitchener campus is located in the historic and fully renovated former St. Jerome's high school building.

On April 18, 2018, Wilfrid Laurier University was granted approval for a new campus location in Milton. In partnership with Conestoga College, the new campus will be built in the Milton Education Village. According to WLU's webpage on the Milton campus with respect to program offerings, "In fall 2017, the university's Board of Governors endorsed the Laurier Milton proposal, and the university Senate approved a Milton Academic Plan in principle. This academic plan aligns with the province's desire to offer programming with a focus on science, technology, engineering, arts and mathematics. This plan, however, was scrapped due to budget cuts that the conservative government made. They decided not to expand on three other separate campuses for other Canadian universities as well. (STEAM)."

2017–18 freedom of speech controversy
In November 2017, the university became the subject of a free speech and academic freedom controversy for censuring a teaching assistant, Lindsay Shepherd, who used a three-minute recording of a debate involving Jordan Peterson about the compelled use of gender-neutral pronouns in a communications class. The case was criticized by several newspaper editorial boards and national newspaper columnists as an example of the suppression of free speech on university campuses. After the release of the audio recording of the meeting in which the TA was censured, WLU President Deborah MacLatchy and the TA's supervising professor Nathan Rambukkana published letters of formal apology. An independent investigation found the teaching assistant had not violated university policies. It also found that the subsequent meeting held by several professors berating her for using the recording was conducted with "significant overreach." Peterson and Shepherd are each suing the university as well as the professors who were involved. Two of the professors have filed a third-party claim against Shepherd.

Academics

The university has an enrolment of about 17,000 full-time and part-time undergraduate students, and over 1,500 full-time and part-time graduate students. It has over 500 faculty and staff members. Laurier has been transitioning from a primarily undergraduate university to a mid-size research university. In the 2022 Maclean's magazine survey of Canadian universities, Laurier was ranked seventh out of 15 Canadian universities in the magazine's comprehensive university category.

The registrar's report for winter 2016 indicates that the six most popular majors at Laurier, across the entire university, were (in order): business, communications studies, psychology, criminology, economics, and biology.

The internationally renowned faculty of music at Laurier is considered one of the best in the country,. A September 2017 report indicated that students could choose to concentrate in composition, comprehensive, music education, music history, theory and critical analysis, performance, or community music; second-year Bachelor of Music students could take music therapy as an option. In addition, Laurier is home to the Penderecki String Quartet - an internationally-recognised group playing largely new compositions. The music faculty boasts two performance spaces, the Theatre Auditorium and the Maureen Forrester Recital Hall (named after a contralto and former chancellor of Laurier). The faculty also attracts a greater percentage of students from outside Ontario than any other faculty at Laurier. Laurier's music program offers the only master's degree in music therapy. Laurier's strength in "music and business education" has been identified as one of the reasons that the Waterloo region is a "powerful educational hub" by former University of Waterloo president, and former governor-general of Canada, David Johnston. Laurier was named Canada's Best Music Campus by CBC Radio in 2013.

According to Maclean's, "Standout Programs" at Laurier in 2017-2018 included business administration, game design and development, and law and arts (B.A from Laurier and a law degree from the University of Sussex in the U.K. in six years).

Laurier was the headquarters of the Academic Council of the United Nations System, the goal of which is to strengthen the study of international organizations and to create strong ties between the academic community and diplomats within international organizations.

The Balsillie School of International Affairs, opened in uptown Waterloo in 2008, is a partnership between Laurier, the University of Waterloo, and the Centre for International Governance Innovation. The Balsillie School offers three programs: a masters in arts in global governance, a masters in international public policy and a PhD program in global governance.

Cooperative education
Laurier has the oldest business cooperative education ("co-op") program in English-speaking Canada and the largest business co-op program in Canada. Students are able to enjoy co-op opportunities with dozens of companies, including KPMG, Ernst and Young, PepsiCo, Scotiabank, Unilever, and Manulife Financial.

Laurier Library
As of the 2014-2015 annual report, the Laurier Library holds 1 million print volumes, 312,000 electronic books, 68,000 electronic journals, and 280 databases, thousands of media titles (about 5,000 including streaming and DVDs). In addition, the library is a member of the tri-university "group of libraries" (University of Waterloo, University of Guelph, Wilfrid Laurier University), through which access to a combined information collection in excess of seven million print items is available.

There are three physical locations for the library: the Waterloo campus' primary library (on the west end of the campus, housing the majority of the collection and the majority of the librarians and staff), the Brantford campus' digital library and learning commons space (in Grand River Hall, which includes offices for the librarians on that campus) and the collection space in the Brantford Public Library (on the first and second floors), and the Social Work Library in Kitchener.

The library, in conjunction with Wilfrid Laurier University Press, hosts "Scholars Commons @ Laurier," an institutional repository that aims to support open scholarly communication, collaboration, and lasting visibility and recognition for Laurier scholarship. It houses faculty scholarship, theses, dissertations, online journals, and an archival collection of The Cord dating back to 1926.

Campuses

Waterloo campus

The Lazaridis School of Business & Economics is the business school of Wilfrid Laurier, and is located in Waterloo, Ontario. With more than 160 full-time and 60 part-time faculty. the school is the largest faculty at Wilfrid. As of 2018, the School had over 30,000 alumni. In 2010, it was named an "outstanding business school" by The Princeton Review, which acknowledged that "We are pleased to recommend Laurier as one of the best institutions students could attend to earn an MBA". The school is accredited by the Association to Advance Collegiate Schools of Business (AACSB International) for all of its undergraduate, master's, and PhD programs.

Locations
Diploma programs in Accounting and Business Administration are also offered by the Lazaridis School.

History
Originally the "School of Business & Economics," it was renamed in September 2015 after Mike Lazaridis, co-founder of Research In Motion, and former Chancellor of the University of Waterloo. The re-branding followed a 2015 announcement of his pledge of $20-million for a new technology-focused management institute at the business school. In 2016, the School moved to a new building facility, the Lazaridis Hall building, at 200 University Avenue West in Waterloo.

Collaboration
A program in association with the University of Waterloo confers double degrees. The Lazaridis School offers a part-time MBA program in downtown Toronto at the St. Andrew's Club and Conference Centre.

Laurier's Waterloo Campus is located in the Regional Municipality of Waterloo. The majority of the University's faculties reside at the Waterloo Campus, including Business, Arts, Science, Music, and Health. Altogether, approximately 15,000 students attend classes at the Waterloo campus.

Residences

Laurier Waterloo operates one all female residence (Leupold Residence), one all male residence (Euler Residence), and multiple co-ed student residences: Bouckaert Hall, Bricker Residence, Clara Conrad Hall, Hickory St. Apartments, King's Court Residence, King Street Residence, CH Little House, Macdonald House, Marshall Street Apartments, Regina Residence, Regina Towers, Spruce Street Apartments, University Place Residence, Waterloo College Hall, Willison Hall. Together, these residences house approximately 2,780 men and women, with 2,664 beds reserved for undergraduate first-year students.

When applying to residences, students can choose to be a part of a Residence Learning Community, a themed residence environment where all members share a common interest, major, or coursework. These communities are designed to extend opportunities for learning and development beyond the classroom, mainly through networking opportunities with peers, faculty, and staff. Residence Life currently operates the following communities: Global: Thinking Global, Acting Local, Innovation: Entrepreneurship, Languages and Literatures, School of Business and Economics, Faculty of Science, Singer and Songwriter, The Reel World: English and Film Studies, and Vimy Hall: War, Memory and the Canadian Military Experience.

Brantford campus

Laurier's Brantford Campus is located in Brantford, Ontario, approximately 50 km south of the campus in Waterloo. The campus opened its doors in 1999 with a total of 39 students in its inaugural year. As of January 2015, there were 2,625 full-time students, and an unstated number of part-time students, enrolled at the school. In late 2017, Laurier estimated a total of over 3,000 students.

According to Maclean's, Laurier's "Standout Programs" in 2017-2018 included Game Design and Development at the Brantford campus. "The program develops skills not only in game design, project management and entrepreneurship, but also considers how transformative games are used in areas such as education, corporate training, health care and more."

Residences
Brantford campus has the following apartment-style residences:
 Lawyer's Hall
 Post House
 Grand River Hall
 Lucy Marco Place
 Expositor Place
 Wilkes House

Kitchener campus

In the Fall of 2006 the Faculty of Social Work (previously on the Waterloo campus) moved to downtown Kitchener. Located on Duke St. it moved into the old St. Jerome's High School which was designated a heritage site by the City of Kitchener. This move allowed the students to be closer to the community and social service agencies with which they are partnered. Also in an effort to partner better with the community and make the building more welcoming, faculty and staff held such events as the Political Coffee House Series, several all-candidates debates and the Expressions of Social Justice Festival

Planned Milton campus
The town of Milton, Ontario and Laurier have worked together since 2008 to develop a 150-acre campus in Milton within the planned Milton Education Village (MEV) on land donated by the town. In April 2018, the provincial party then in power announced a funding plan ($90 million) for the MEV that would accommodate a satellite campus of the university and also of Conestoga College, a recent partner in the project. Construction was expected to conclude in Q3 of 2021; in the meantime, Laurier would offer credit courses in rented premises, commencing in September 2019.

In October 2018, the new Conservative government, elected in June 2018, withdrew the funding before any construction had begun, citing a greater than expected provincial deficit, effectively canceling plans for the Milton campus. Mayor Gordon Krantz said the town would explore alternatives for funding the Milton Education Village campus. A Laurier news release said that the university would continue working with the town and other partners to find an alternate solution to fund the campus.

As of 2019, Laurier was offering some services in Milton, including a Master of Education program at the Milton Education Village Innovation Centre and a Lecture Series. In summer, Laurier was operating the Enriched Academic Program (LEAP) day camp.

Campus safety
A 2015 survey found that 40% of Wilfrid Laurier students had experienced gendered violence, and 13.4% of Wilfrid Laurier students had experienced sexual assault. Also in 2015, Wilfrid Laurier University was criticized for allowing a male student accused of raping a female student in her dorm room to continue to attend classes alongside his accuser.

Athletics
The university is represented in Canadian Interuniversity Sport (CIS) by the Wilfrid Laurier Golden Hawks.

The history of the team name (Golden Hawks) dates back to the 1961. For many years, the Waterloo College teams were called simply the Waterloo College teams, although sometimes they were called the Purple and Gold and other times the Waterloons.
In 1950, the college's newspaper mused that a name was needed, and in December 1951 a new name was tested: the Mules.

Subsequently, the hockey team became the Ice Mules and the women's basketball and volleyball teams were known as the Mulettes.

In 1960, with the shift from college to university status, the university student newspaper again lobbied for change.
At a meeting that year, somebody suggested Golden Hawks and that was the name adopted. A headline in the January 16, 1961 issue of the newspaper read "From 'Jackass' to 'Bird of Prey'".

On November 13, 2004, the Golden Hawks football team won the Yates Cup against the McMaster Marauders at University Stadium in front of a record crowd of 8,175. It was the sixth Yates Cup victory for Laurier in its history. The game also ended McMaster's four-year Ontario championship winning streak. The men's football team scored a second successive Yates Cup victory in November, 2005, followed by a victory in the Uteck Bowl against Acadia. The Hawks then defeated the University of Saskatchewan Huskies 24–23 to win the 2005 Vanier Cup, their first since 1991.

Laurier's first female national championship was won in 1992 by the women's soccer team, which followed that up with their second CIS title in 1995. The men's soccer team claimed back-to-back national championships in 2000 & 2001.

In 2007 the women's lacrosse team won their fifth OUA Ontario University Athletics gold medal in a row. In February 2008, the women's hockey team claimed its fifth gold medal in as many years and seventh since 1998. The women's hockey team won its first CIS national championship in 2005. Both teams have since won sixth consecutive championships in their respective sports.

In 2008, both the men's and women's curling teams won the inaugural CIS Championships and represented Canada in China at the 2009 World University Games. The women's team repeated as CIS Champion's in 2009 in Montreal and went on to represent Canada in the Karuizawa International Curling championships where they claimed first place.

Facilities
The athletic facilities at Wilfrid Laurier University include an Athletic Complex, a Football Stadium and an outdoor multi-purpose fieldturf field. The Athletic Complex houses three Gyms, two squash courts, an Olympic-size swimming pool, a rock-climbing Wall, and Aerobics/Weight Rooms. University Stadium includes a fieldturf football field and a large indoor gymnasium.

School song 
Laurier's school song is Laurier We'll Praise Thee Ever (originally titled Waterloo We'll Praise Thee Ever). It was written by Maxwell A. Magee in 1938. The song was revived in 2005 by the WLU Alumni Choir and the words were adapted to reflect the change from Waterloo College to Wilfrid Laurier University.

Students' Union
The Wilfrid Laurier University Students' Union (WLUSU) represents undergraduate students at both campuses of Wilfrid Laurier University. It operates the Fred Nichols Campus Centre in Waterloo as well as the Students' Centre on Laurier's Brantford Campus. Wilfrid Laurier University Students' Union's Arms, Supporters, Flag and Badge were registered with the Canadian Heraldic Authority on January 15, 2003.

WLUSU is funded by undergraduate student fees, and all students are automatically members. The Students' Union provides a number of services for students, including bus passes, Direct2U Prescription, emergency response team, food bank, foot patrol, health and dental insurance coverage, the member card, peer-help line, student life line, and tech share. The Wilfrid Laurier University Students' Union Clubs and Associations department supports over 130 clubs and associations involving over 3,000 students. Clubs and Associations supports all clubs by offering resources and financial support as well as acting as a liaison to the Students' Union and University administration. The Students' Union's University Affairs department is responsible for political advocacy at the municipal, provincial, and federal levels of government, with provincial advocacy supported by the Ontario Undergraduate Student Alliance.

Alumni
Laurier has over 100,000 graduates from 85 countries. Among the notable alumni are Carolyn A. Wilkins, the first woman appointed Senior Deputy Governor of the Bank of Canada, Paul Heinbecker, Canada's Ambassador to the UN (2000-2004), Bill Downe, CEO of Bank of Montreal (2007-2017) and stock exchange founder Brad Katsuyama, the central character in Michael Lewis's Flash Boys: A Wall Street Revolt.

Greek life

Wilfrid Laurier is home to a vibrant and growing Greek life, with each group having a large focus on philanthropic endeavours.

Fraternities:

 Alpha Epsilon Pi
 Pi Kappa Alpha
 Sigma Chi
 Zeta Psi

Sororities:

 Alpha Omega (Local)
 Alpha Phi
 alpha Kappa Delta Phi

University people

See also
List of Ontario universities
List of colleges and universities named after people
Higher education in Ontario
Canadian government scientific research organizations
Canadian university scientific research organizations
Canadian industrial research and development organizations

References

External links

 
Educational institutions established in 1960
1960 establishments in Ontario
Universities in Ontario